Let the Children Die is a 2009 album by Canadian hip hop artist D-Sisive. The album is produced by the likes of Muneshine, Norman Krates and The Arkeoligists, among others. Guest features include Classified, 9th Uno, Little Vic, Muneshine, Conscience, Krypios, Buck 65 and Guily Simpson.

Reception 
The album was nominated for a 2009 Polaris Music Prize. "Nobody With a Notepad" won a 2012 Juno Award for rap recording of the year  and Socan's ECHO songwriting award in 2009.

Track listing

References

2009 albums
D-Sisive albums